Nemipterus is a genus of fish in the family Nemipteridae. They are native to the Indian and Pacific Oceans, but now also occur in the Mediterranean Sea due to Lessepsian migration.

Species
There are currently 28 recognized species in this genus:
 Nemipterus aurifilum (J. D. Ogilby, 1910) (Yellow-lip thread-fin bream)
 Nemipterus aurora B. C. Russell, 1993 (Dawn thread-fin bream)
 Nemipterus balinensis (Bleeker, 1858) (Balinese thread-fin bream)
 Nemipterus balinensoides (Popta, 1918) (Dwarf thread-fin bream)
 Nemipterus bathybius Snyder, 1911 (Yellow-belly thread-fin bream)
 Nemipterus bipunctatus (Valenciennes, 1830) (Delagoa thread-fin bream)
 Nemipterus celebicus (Bleeker, 1854) (Celebes thread-fin bream)
Nemipterus elaine Russell & Gouws, 2020 
 Nemipterus flavomandibularis B. C. Russell & Tweddle, 2013 (Yellow-jaw thread-fin bream) 
 Nemipterus furcosus (Valenciennes, 1830) (Fork-tailed thread-fin bream)
 Nemipterus gracilis (Bleeker, 1873) (Graceful thread-fin bream)
 Nemipterus hexodon (Quoy & Gaimard, 1824) (Ornate thread-fin bream)
 Nemipterus isacanthus (Bleeker, 1873) (Tear-drop thread-fin bream)
 Nemipterus japonicus (Bloch, 1791) (Japanese thread-fin bream) 
 Nemipterus marginatus (Valenciennes, 1830) (Red-filament thread-fin bream)
 Nemipterus mesoprion (Bleeker, 1853) (Mauve-lip thread-fin bream)
 Nemipterus nematophorus (Bleeker, 1854) (Double-whip thread-fin bream)
 Nemipterus nematopus (Bleeker, 1851) (Yellow-tipped thread-fin bream)
 Nemipterus nemurus (Bleeker, 1857) (Red-spine thread-fin bream)
 Nemipterus peronii (Valenciennes, 1830) (Notched-fin thread-fin bream)
 Nemipterus randalli B. C. Russell, 1986 (Randall's thread-fin bream)
 Nemipterus sugillatus B. C. Russell & H. C. Ho, 2017 
 Nemipterus tambuloides (Bleeker, 1853) (Five-lined thread-fin bream)
 Nemipterus theodorei J. D. Ogilby, 1916 (Theodore's thread-fin bream)
 Nemipterus thosaporni B. C. Russell, 1991 (Pale-fin thread-fin bream)
 Nemipterus virgatus (Houttuyn, 1782) (Golden thread-fin bream)
 Nemipterus vitiensis B. C. Russell, 1990 (Fiji thread-fin bream)
 Nemipterus zysron (Bleeker, 1856) (Slender thread-fin bream)

References

 
Marine fish genera
Taxa named by William John Swainson